Emina Bektas (born March 30, 1993) is an American tennis player.
 
She has career-high WTA rankings of 188 in singles, reached on 7 March 2022, and 78 in doubles, achieved on 11 July 2022. Bektas has won six singles and 23 doubles titles on the ITF Circuit.

Professional career

2016-17: Grand Slam doubles debut
Bektas made her Grand Slam debut at the 2016 US Open in the mixed doubles main-draw with Evan King; they fell in the first round.

The following year, she also had her debut at the 2017 US Open, where she played with Amanda Anisimova in women's doubles as a wildcard pair; they also fell in the first round.

Her biggest singles win to date on ITF Circuit came at the 2017 Coleman Vision Tennis Championships in Albuquerque.

2022: Grand Slam singles debut
She qualified into the main draw in her Grand Slam singles debut at the Australian Open, losing in the first round to Liudmila Samsonova.

She reached her first WTA doubles final in April at the 2022 Copa Colsanitas partnering Tara Moore.

She also qualified for the Wimbledon Championships, making her debut at this major where she lost to Bianca Andreescu, in the first round.

College career
Bektas attended college at the University of Michigan from 2011 to 2015.

Personal life
Emina is married to fellow professional tennis player Tara Moore.

Performance timelines

Singles

Doubles

WTA career finals

Doubles: 1 (runner-up)

ITF Circuit finals

Singles: 9 (6 titles, 3 runner–ups)

Doubles: 36 (23 titles, 13 runner-ups)

Notes

References

External links
 
 

1993 births
Living people
American female tennis players
Tennis players from Indianapolis
Michigan Wolverines women's tennis players
American people of Bosnia and Herzegovina descent
German emigrants to the United States
Lesbian sportswomen
LGBT tennis players
American LGBT sportspeople